P-384 is the elliptic curve currently specified in NSA Suite B Cryptography for the ECDSA and ECDH algorithms. In binary, this mod is given by 111...1100...0011...11. That is, 288 1s followed by 64 0s followed by 32 1s. The curve is given by the equation  where  is given by a certain 384 bit number.

External links 
FIPS 186-4 standards where the curve is defined 
Commercial National Security Algorithm (CNSA) Suite Factsheet 

Cryptography standards